The Birdanca is a right tributary of the river Bârzava in Romania. It discharges into the Bârzava near Denta.

References

Rivers of Romania
Rivers of Timiș County